Rajendra Prasanna (born 15 April 1956) is an Indian classical flautist and shehnai (Indian oboe) player from Benares Gharana.

Career
Rajendra was born in Varanasi, Uttar Pradesh, India.  He learnt music from his father Raghunath Prasanna and from his uncles Bholanath Prasanna and Vishnu Prasanna.
His family moved to Delhi in the early seventies, and he later became the disciple of Hafeez Ahmed Khan and Sarfaraz Hussain Khan. He also took lessons from singer Mahadev Mishra of Benares Gharana.

Performances
He performed at the Edinburgh festival (UK), Sydney Opera House, WOMAD Festival (Australia, New Zealand), World Music festival for golden jubilee celebration for India's Independence held in America, Canada and Switzerland (U.N.O. Headquarters) in 1997, Concert for George in London (Ravi Shankar project), Opera de Lyon in France.

Awards and honors
 Top Grade Artist of All India Radio
 Rajendra was the recipient of various awards and honors including Uttar Pradesh Sangeet Natak Academy Award - Flute & Shehnai (1995)
 Grammy Award certificate for his participation in "Concert for George" in 2004.
 Lifetime Achievement Award by Sahara India.
 Sangeet Natak Akademi Award - Hindustani Instrumental - Shehnai / Flute 2017.

Discography
 Indian Classical Music by Rajendra Prasanna - T-Series
 Flute Fantasy
 Colors of life
 Tribute to Pt. Raghunath Prasanna
 Nirmal Sangeet
 Ghoomar
 Enchanting of Himalayas
 A tribute to Ustad Bismillah Khan (Shehnai) - 2006

References

External links
Official website

1956 births
Living people
Hindustani instrumentalists
Indian flautists
Bansuri players
Shehnai players
Musicians from Varanasi
Recipients of the Sangeet Natak Akademi Award